The Vice President of Ciskei was a political position in that republic. The Vice President was appointed as a deputy by the President.

Rev. Willie Xaba held the office between December 1981 and 1983.

References 

Ciskei
Politics of South Africa
Ciskei
Titles held only by one person